Ragtime is a 1927 American silent drama film directed by Scott Pembroke and starring John Bowers, Marguerite De La Motte and Robert Ellis. It is considered lost.

Synopsis
It portrays the romance between a Tin Pan Alley songwriter and a high society girl.

Cast
 John Bowers as Ted Mason 
 Marguerite De La Motte as Beth Barton 
 Robert Ellis as Steve Martin, aka 'Slick' 
 Rose Dione as Yvonne Martin, aka 'Goldie' 
 William H. Strauss as Max Ginsberg 
 Kate Bruce as Mrs. Mason

References

Bibliography
 Munden, Kenneth White. The American Film Institute Catalog of Motion Pictures Produced in the United States, Part 1. University of California Press, 1997.

External links

1927 films
1927 drama films
American black-and-white films
Silent American drama films
American silent feature films
1920s English-language films
Films directed by Scott Pembroke
Ragtime films
1920s American films